The 2014 World Team Championship (short: WTC 2014) was a professional team pool tournament that took place from 27 July to 2 August 2014. The event was held in Beijing, China. It was the third edition of the World Team Championship which was sanctioned by the World Pool-Billiard Association.

The defending champion was the Chinese Taipei team who won the 2012 World Team Championship, but they lost in the quarter-finals to the Filipino team. China defeated the Philippines in the final 4–2.

Teams 
Below is the list of participating teams, along with the four to six team members.

Results

Group stage

Group A 

Table

Group B 

Table

Group C 

Table

Group D 

Table

Groupe E 

Table

Group F 

Table

Knockout round

References

External links 
 
 

World Team Championship (pool)
2014 in cue sports
2014 in Chinese sport
International sports competitions hosted by China
Sports competitions in Beijing
July 2014 sports events in Europe
August 2014 sports events in China